The Tiny Toon Adventures animated television series features an extensive cast of characters. The show's central characters are mostly various forms of anthropomorphic animals, based on Looney Tunes characters from earlier films and shows. In the series, the characters attend a school called Acme Looniversity, set in the cartoon community of Acme Acres.

Main characters

Buster Bunny

Buster Bunny (voiced by Charlie Adler and later John Kassir in the original) is a main character of the show. Buster is a young, blue-and-white male 14-year-old bunny rabbit with a red shirt and white gloves, and is Babs's best friend. In the last episode, It's a Wonderful Tiny Toon Christmas Special, Babs states that Buster is her boyfriend. Bugs Bunny is Buster's mentor. Adler voiced Buster in the cancelled video game Tiny Toon Adventures: Defenders of the Universe. Buster is based on the Chuck Jones version of Bugs Bunny.

Babs Bunny

Barbara Anne "Babs" Bunny (voiced by Tress MacNeille in the original and Ashleigh Crystal Hairston in the reboot) is a main character of the show. Babs likes doing impressions and wearing disguises and dislikes being addressed by her full name. She is a young pink female 14-year-old  bunny rabbit with a yellow shirt, violet skirt, and violet bows on her ears. Babs is based on the Bob Clampett version of Bugs Bunny.

In Looniversity, according to character designer Leonard Kiraly and showrunner Erin Gibson, she is Buster's fraternal twin, retconning the running gag "no relation".

Plucky Duck
Plucky Duck (voiced by Joe Alaskey in the original and Nathan Ruegger in Tiny Toon Adventures) is a young, 13-year-old green male duck in a white tank top. Plucky is based on Chuck Jones's Daffy Duck. Plucky is friends with Hamton J. Pig and Buster Bunny, despite the fact that they frequently annoy each other. Plucky is quite jealous of Buster and Babs's popularity, similar to Daffy's insane jealousy of Bugs's popularity, and very often tries to undermine it in various sneaky, underhanded ways. Plucky constantly pines for the love of Shirley McLoon, though she has very little patience for him.

Hamton J. Pig
Hamton J. Pig (voiced by Don Messick in the TV series, Billy West in video games) is a young, 12-year-old pink male pig who wears blue overalls. Based on Porky Pig, Hamton's role in the series is as a straight man, often against Plucky Duck's antics. The only difference is that unlike his mentor Porky, Hamton never stutters. Hamton is an overeater who is obsessed with cleanliness. Billy West took over the role of Hamton in a few video games after Don Messick's death, including 1999's Tiny Toon Adventures: Toonenstein.

Shirley McLoon
Shirley "The Loon" McLoon (voiced by Gail Matthius) is a loon citizen of Acme Acres. She is based on Daffy Duck's main love interest, Melissa Duck. She speaks with a thick Valley girl accent. Although she seems reasonably intelligent, she is obsessed with superficial New Age paraphernalia. Her name is a pun on fellow New Age aficionado Shirley MacLaine, and she later appeared in an episode of Animaniacs, standing next to MacLaine. Most characters refer to her as "Shirley the Loon" rather than "Shirley McLoon". She appears not to notice the negative connotations of the nickname and often recites "Oh, what a loon I am" while meditating. Shirley is romantically pursued by Plucky Duck and Fowlmouth. Despite her annoyance with Plucky's flirtatious gestures, Shirley does seem to care for him and occasionally dates him. According to writer Andrew Stanton, She is the Girly Girl to Elmyra’s Tomboy because Elmyra is a perky, happy-go-lucky tomboy and Shirley is an intelligent Girly Girl. Shirley often hangs out with Babs and Fifi. She can tell fortunes, obtains psychokinetic powers, and is a skilled ballerina.

Fifi La Fume
Fifi La Fume (voiced by Kath Soucie) is a young, purple and white female skunk with a pink bow in her hair. Based on Pepé Le Pew, she shares his character traits of having a French accent and aggressively seeking romance, only to find the object of her affection is repulsed by her odor and aggressive advances. Unlike Pepé Le Pew, Fifi often takes being rejected to heart and cries over it. Fifi often unsuccessfully attempts to chase boys who have ended up with white stripes painted down their backs, such as Furrball, Calamity Coyote, and Little Beeper. Unlike Pepé Le Pew, Fifi does not mind if boys chase her. Some episodes downplayed her romantic life, and showed her doing random group activities with other characters. She lives in a striped 1959 Cadillac in a wrecking yard.

Elmyra Duff
Elmyra Duff (voiced by Cree Summer) is a 12-year-old, redheaded girl who wears a blue blouse, white skirt, black Mary Janes over white socks, and a blue bow with a skull at the center. Despite being based on Elmer Fudd – she has a similar face, her red hair has been revealed to be a wig on several occasions, and her last name backwards is a misspelled take on "Fudd" – she is the total opposite of him. Instead of hunting animals, she cares for them to smothering lengths and falls into the stereotype of the "spoiled and piercing-voiced girl." She is one of the few human characters in the series, and she attends Acme Looniversity with the animal characters, where she also serves as the nurse. In two episodes, Elmyra's family is shown, including her mother, inventor father, typical '90s teen sister, younger brother, super-strong baby brother, and a maid.

Elmyra was also featured as a co-protagonist and ally to Pinky and the Brain in a spin-off, Pinky, Elmyra & the Brain. Though initially claimed by Cree Summer to be removed from the show, Tiny Toons Looniversity.

Montana Max
Montana Max (voiced by Danny Cooksey), nicknamed "Monty", is a young, brown-haired 12-year-old boy and the main antagonist. Based on Yosemite Sam, he is an evil, loud-mouthed, and money-hungry tycoon. Monty has an American location in his name and is often an enemy to Buster Bunny, much like Yosemite Sam is to Bugs Bunny. Like Elmyra, Monty is a human and attends Acme Looniversity. He is portrayed as a very wealthy and stubborn boy who lives in a mansion and doesn't have any siblings or friends. However, he does have a (rarely shown) sweet side and has been shown to have a good imagination. Elmyra likes Monty a lot, though he usually feels nothing but annoyance towards her. He was the very first villain of the series, as seen in the pilot episode.

Recurring characters

Gogo Dodo
Gogo Dodo (voiced by Frank Welker) is a young, green male dodo with blue shoes and a pink and purple umbrella sticking out from the top of his head. Gogo performs various bizarre sight gags and stunts. Unlike the other characters who attend Acme Looniversity, Gogo makes his home in the Daliesque realm known as Wackyland, a surreal place with constantly changing backgrounds. It is on the outskirts of the city of Acme Acres, which is the usual setting of Tiny Toon Adventures. Gogo is the only student related to one of the Looney Tunes characters—he is a relative of the Dodo bird in Porky in Wackyland, who was retroactively named Yoyo Dodo). Gogo's catchphrase is "It's been surreal!"

Furrball
Furrball (vocal effects provided by Frank Welker; Rob Paulsen provides his voice in "Cinemaniacs" and "Buster and the Wolverine" episodes) is a young, blue male cat with a hole in his right ear and a bandage on his tail. Furrball is usually depicted as living in a cardboard box in an alleyway, although sometimes he is shown as one of Elmyra's pets and briefly had a home with Mary Melody. He is a peaceful and innocent character, but he is also one of the most unfortunate characters in the show, since he is almost always chased, abused, or bullied, often by being squashed. For example, during the intro credits, he gets flattened by a falling upright piano to the lyric of "Furrball is unlucky", while peacefully sniffing a flower. He is less anthropomorphic in nature than the other animal characters, generally walking on all fours and almost always mute, except for making typical cat sounds; he is known to be mentored by Sylvester the Cat. Furrball is based on Penelope Pussycat and the Chuck Jones version of Sylvester, both of whom are silent. Furrball often chases Sweetie Pie, who is based on Tweety. In one speaking role ("Cinemaniacs"), he was voiced by Rob Paulsen in a mockup of Leonard McCoy from Star Trek. He also has another very brief speaking role in the episode "Buster and the Wolverine.

Sweetie Bird
Sweetie Bird (or Sweetie Pie) (voiced by Candi Milo, then Tessa Netting in the reboot) is a young, pink female canary with a light blue ribbon bow in her plumage. She is based on the Bob Clampett version of Tweety Pie. Like her predecessor, she is colored pink and is devious around feline enemies like Furrball. Sweetie chases Bookworm (based on a nameless bookworm character in Chuck Jones's Sniffles the Mouse cartoons) with about the same success as Furrball. Though it is only seen in one episode, Sweetie, like Plucky, is also quite jealous of Buster and Babs's popularity and is the only character other than Plucky to openly speak up about it. In one scene, she was cared for by an eagle until he realized that she was too crazy and dangerous to be around. She sometimes switches from her babyish voice to a louder, more obnoxious voice.

Dizzy Devil
Dizzy Devil (voiced by Maurice LaMarche) is a young and lavender male Tasmanian devil with a yellow propeller cap, as well as one pink eye and one green eye, and is also crosseyed. He is based on the Tasmanian Devil, and he spins around like a tornado and eats constantly like him. Also like Taz, his speech is generally monosyllabic or composed of random noises. Unlike Taz, he has no ears, horns, or tail. Dizzy is adored and sometimes accompanied by a trio of young ladies, who often make the other guys like Montana Max go crazy. Dizzy meets them in an episode where he fell in love with a little tornado, thinking that it is another Tasmanian Devil. When the tornado leaves the city, Dizzy becomes depressed, so the trio of young ladies take pity on him and decide to pet him.

Calamity Coyote
Calamity Coyote (voiced by Frank Welker) is a young, gray male coyote with pink sneakers; he is based on Wile E. Coyote. Calamity never speaks, instead communicating through noises and signs that he pulls out from behind his back. Calamity is also shown to be scientifically proficient, constructing random devices for the other characters. He pursues Little Beeper unsuccessfully. Like Wile E., Calamity's devices frequently malfunction. Calamity is less antagonistic than Wile E., preferring to work on his various inventions rather than chase Little Beeper.

Little Beeper
Little Beeper (voiced by Frank Welker) is a young roadrunner with red and orange feathers and blue sneakers. Much like his Looney Tunes counterpart, the Road Runner, Beeper spends most of his time outrunning and avoiding capture by Calamity Coyote. Unlike the Road Runner, Beeper can laugh and make other sounds, but he does not speak.

Supporting characters

Li'l Sneezer
Li'l Sneezer (voiced by Kath Soucie), is based on the classic animated mouse Sniffles from the Looney Tunes shorts. However, his extremely talkative personality is based on Little Blabbermouse. He is a young, gray male mouse who wears a diaper. He is shown to be allergic to many things. His allergies trigger exaggerated, explosive, gale-forced sneezes capable of seriously damaging or destroying buildings, as Elmyra had the misfortune of finding out. He is the youngest of the students at Acme Looniversity, as he is the only one seen wearing diapers. Due to his small size, he sometimes spends time with other smaller students like Sweetie.

Arnold the Pit Bull
Arnold the Pit Bull (voiced by Rob Paulsen) is a white, muscular, male pit bull with a pair of black sunglasses, parodying Arnold Schwarzenegger. He is one of the few characters who does not attend Acme Looniversity and isn't based on an existing Warner Bros. character, though there is some connection between him and Hector the bulldog from the Sylvester and Tweety shorts. Arnold has various jobs, including lifeguard, doorman, zookeeper, security guard, bouncer, and gym owner. He hails from Romania, as mentioned in the episode "It's Buster Bunny Time", which explains his strong accent. His love interest is another white muscular pit bull named Arnolda.

Byron Basset
Byron Basset (voiced by Frank Welker) is a brown, black and white male basset hound, generally portrayed as being slow and lazy. He is based on Looney Tunes's many dog characters, specifically Barnyard Dawg. One sight gag involves him turning around: to do so, he pulls his head and tail inside the folds of his body, then pulls them out the other side. He is also shown to be capable of flight, as seen in the movie Tiny Toon Adventures: How I Spent My Vacation, using his stretchy skin to glide on a waft of air. Byron is sometimes shown as one of Elmyra's pets. His end tag is a simple "woof".

Fowlmouth
Fowlmouth (voiced by Rob Paulsen) is a young, white male rooster with a blue, short-sleeved shirt. He is based on Foghorn Leghorn, though he speaks in a New York accent instead of a Southern accent. Fowlmouth is shown to be very polite when calm but when his short temper is provoked, he launches into a bleeped-out swearing tirade. In his first appearance, he was even shown to pepper all of his sentences with profanity, but he curbs this when children are around. Other appearances show him using euphemisms instead, likely due to Buster's efforts to train him out of swearing in the premiere episode. Fowlmouth's profane catchphrase is "dadgum". In Tiny Toon Adventures: How I Spent My Vacation, he annoys people in a theater by talking about the movie plotline.

Mary Melody
Mary Melody (voiced by Cindy McGee in her debut episode "Cross-Country Kitty," and Cree Summer in all other appearances) is a young, African-American girl. Her name is a pun on the Merrie Melodies series of Warner Brothers shorts. She may be based on Granny, as she is the human master of Furrball, but she is modeled on the one-shot character So White from the controversial Warner Bros. short "Coal Black and de Sebben Dwarfs". She attends Acme Looniversity with the other characters and sometimes hangs out with Babs, Shirley, and Fifi. Mary has a sweet disposition with almost everybody, unlike her human counterparts Montana Max and Elmyra Duff (also voiced by Cree Summer). Mary lives in an apartment building in the city of Acme Acres.

Bookworm
Bookworm is a green male worm with large glasses. He is based on the bookworm companion of Sniffles. He works at the Acme Looniversity library and is shown to be well-read and proficient on the computer. In some scenes, he is pursued by Sweetie. Bookworm does not speak; however, he does say something just before the football game in Buster Busts Loose on the SNES, though it is only on-screen text.

Concord Condor
Concord Condor (voiced by Rob Paulsen) is a young, purple male condor. He attends Acme Looniversity and lives in Acme Acres. He is based on Beaky Buzzard. Concord is shy and dimwitted, often ending sentences in "nope nope nope nope," or "yup yup yup yup." He lives at Acme Zoo, where he spends most of his time relaxing in his nest and watching TV. His first name is pronounced the same as the supersonic airliner, the Concorde, in spite of being spelled the same as the town in Massachusetts.

Barky Marky
Barky Marky (voiced by Frank Welker) is a young, brown, and tan male dog. He is based on Looney Tunes's many dog characters, specifically Marc Antony and Sam Sheepdog. Barky Marky is portrayed as a typical canine who loves to play fetch and various other sports and activities. Even though Barky starred in his very own short entitled "Go Fetch" with Elmyra Duff, and made many cameo appearances in other episodes, specials, and movies, Barky Marky was still mocked for his lack of appearances on the Saturday Night Live spoof Weekday Afternoon Live. When Buster Bunny is reading the news out loud from the viewers complaining about him not being in enough episodes, Babs Bunny, posing as a Tiny Toons casting director, asks "Who's Barky Marky?"

Looney Tunes characters

Acme Looniversity staff
The faculty of Acme Looniversity is made up of classic Looney Tunes characters that some of the students are based on:

Teachers 
Bugs Bunny (voiced by Jeff Bergman in most episodes and in the reboot, Greg Burson in "Buster and Babs Go Hawaiian", "Best of Buster Day" and "It's a Wonderful Tiny Toons Christmas Special"), who is the principal  and mentor of Buster Bunny. In Looniversity, Bugs is just a professor of a major class.
Daffy Duck (voiced by Jeff Bergman in most episodes, Greg Burson in "Two-Tone Town"), who serves as the mentor of Plucky Duck.
Porky Pig (voiced by Bob Bergen in "Animaniacs" and "Hero Hamton", Rob Paulsen in "The Wacko World of Sports", Noel Blanc in "Fields of Honey", "The Acme Bowl" and "Hero Hamton", Joe Alaskey in "Music Day", Greg Burson in "It's a Wonderful Tiny Toons Christmas Special"), who is the mentor of Hamton J. Pig.
Elmer Fudd (voiced by Jeff Bergman in "Her Wacky Highness", "Psychic Fun-omenon Day", "Tiny Toon Music Television", "K-ACME TV" and "Viewer Mail Day", Greg Burson in "Journey to the Center of Acme Acres", "Wake Up Call of the Wild", "Fields of Honey", "Spring in Acme Acres", "Here's Hamton" and "Weekday Afternoon Live"), who is the mentor of Elmyra Duff.
Yosemite Sam (voiced by Joe Alaskey in "Gang Busters", "Music Day" and "Best of Buster Day", Charlie Adler in "The Wide World of Elmyra", Jeff Bergman in "Looniversity Daze", "Son of Looniversity Daze" and "K-ACME TV", Maurice LaMarche in "Two-Tone Town"), who is the mentor of Montana Max. In "Best of Buster Bunny Day", Yosemite Sam was the Vice Principal of Acme Looniversity.
Pepé Le Pew (voiced by Greg Burson in the original and Eric Bauza in the reboot), who is the mentor of Fifi La Fume.
Sylvester the Cat (voiced by Joe Alaskey in "Test Stressed", "The Wacko World of Sports" and "The Acme Bowl," Jeff Bergman in "Animaniacs" and in Tiny Toons Looniversity, "Viewer Mail Day" and "Son of the Wacko World of Sports"), who is the mentor of Furrball.
Tweety (voiced by Jeff Bergman in "The Looney Beginning" and "How Sweetie It Is", Bob Bergen in "Animaniacs"), who is the mentor of Sweetie.
The Tasmanian Devil (voiced by Jeff Bergman in "Prom-ise Her Anything" and "Animaniacs", Noel Blanc in "You Asked For It, Pt. 1", Maurice LaMarche in "Ask Mr. Popular", Greg Burson in "Best of Buster Day"), who is the mentor of Dizzy Devil.
Wile E. Coyote (voiced by Joe Alaskey in the original), who is the mentor of Calamity Coyote.
The Road Runner (voiced by Paul Julian), who is the mentor of Little Beeper.
Foghorn Leghorn (voiced by Jeff Bergman in most episodes and in the reboot, Greg Burson in "Buster and Babs Go Hawaiian"), who is the mentor of Fowlmouth (though this is rarely depicted in the show).

Others 
Granny (voiced by June Foray in the original, and Candi Milo who reprised Granny after Space Jam: A New Legacy in the revival) serves as the Head School Nurse. In the "Looniversity Daze" short "What's Up Nurse", Granny is the nurse's office receptionist. In the "Best O' Plucky Duck Day" cartoon "One Minute Til Three", Granny is a computer animation teacher, and a recurring gag has her angrily assigning a thousand-page book report to students who get her questions wrong, which she demands to be completed by Monday. Granny was rewritten into a dean (school Administrator) in Looniversity and retains a wild side to do action sports but understands the university bylaws.
Speedy Gonzales (voiced by Joe Alaskey in the original) is the track coach and sports announcer. He is the mentor of Lightning Rodriguez (although rejected due to fear of backlash over the portrayal of Hispanics).
Pete Puma (voiced by Stan Freberg in most episodes, Joe Alaskey in "Going Places" in the original) works as a janitor.

Other Looney Tunes characters
The following characters have made occasional appearances in this show:

Beaky Buzzard (voiced by Rob Paulsen) – He made a cameo in the episode "High Toon".
Big Bee (voiced by Frank Welker) – He appeared in the episode "Two-Tone Town" where he is friends with Foxy, Roxy, and Goopy Geer. He is based on the bee from "You're Too Careless with Your Kisses".
Bosko and Honey (voiced by Don Messick and B.J. Ward in the original) – They appeared in the episode "Fields of Honey".
Cecil Turtle – He made a cameo in "Going Places" as the bus driver.
Charlie Dog (voiced by Frank Welker) – He made occasional appearances in the series.
Count Bloodcount (voiced by Frank Welker) – He appeared in the episodes "Stuff That Goes Bump in the Night" and "What Makes Toons Tick".
Foxy and Roxy (voiced by Rob Paulsen and Desiree Goyette) – They appeared in the episode "Two-Tone Town" where they are friends with Big Bee and Goopy Geer. Here, they are slightly re-designed to look less like Mickey and Minnie Mouse.
Goopy Geer (voiced by Robert Morse) – He appeared in the episode "Two-Tone Town" where he is friends with Big Bee, Foxy, and Roxy.
Gossamer (voiced by Frank Welker in "Cinemaniacs" and "What Makes Toons Tick" and Maurice LaMarche in "Night Ghoulery".)  – He appeared in the episodes "Cinemaniacs", "What Makes Toons Tick", and "Night Ghoulery".
Gremlins
Henery Hawk
Hubie and Bertie
Hugo the Abominable Snowman (voiced by Joe Alaskey)
Marc Antony
Marvin the Martian (voiced by Joe Alaskey) – He made a few appearances in the show with a major role in "Return to the Acme Acres Zone".
Michigan J. Frog (voiced by John Hillner) – He made appearances in "The Wide World of Elmyra" and "Psychic Fun-omenon Day".
Penelope Pussycat – She made a cameo in the episode "It's a Wonderful Tiny Toons Christmas Special".
Playboy Penguin – He made a cameo in the episode "Prom-ise Her Anything".
Rocky and Mugsy (voiced by Rob Paulsen and Frank Welker) – They appear as juvenile hall inmates in "Gang Busters".
Sam Sheepdog
The Three Bears (voiced by Frank Welker, Tress MacNeille, and Stan Freberg) – Pa Bear, Ma Bear, and Junior Bear appeared in two episodes where they were often paired with Elmyra. In the episode "Here's Hamton", Ma Bear was seen as a lunch lady at Acme Looniversity.
Witch Hazel (voiced by Tress MacNeille in "What Makes Toons Tick", June Foray in "Night Ghoulery")

Minor characters

Tyrone Turtle
Tyrone Turtle (voiced by Edan Gross) is a little green male turtle with a hard shell, based on Cecil Turtle, a minor Looney Tunes character. Tyrone Turtle is seen in a few episodes such as "Hare Today, Gone Tomorrow", and "The Wide World of Elmyra".

Marcia the Martian
Marcia the Martian (voiced by Tress MacNeille) is the young female apprentice and niece of Marvin the Martian, and she only appears in "Duck Dodgers Jr".

Rodrick and Rhubella Rat
Rodrick and Rhubella Rat (voiced by Charlie Adler and Tress MacNeille) are minor characters and students from Perfecto Prep, a rival school of Acme Looniversity. Rodrick and Rhubella are rivals of Buster Bunny and Babs Bunny. They are said to be inspired by Disney characters Mickey and Minnie Mouse. They are portrayed as snooty, rich brats who believe they are above everyone else, but always get outdone and outsmarted by the bunny duo. Both Rubella Rat and Margot Mallard are two of the three quite unenthusiastic cheerleaders for Perfecto Prep.

Danforth Drake and Margot Mallard
Danforth Drake and Margot Mallard (voiced by Rob Paulsen and Kath Soucie), like Roderick and Rhubella Rat, are minor characters and students of Perfecto Prep. They are said to be inspired by Disney characters Donald and Daisy Duck. Danforth Drake and Roderick Rat are roommates, and both are members of Perfecto Prep's sports teams. Both Rubella Rat and Margot Mallard are two of the three quite unenthusiastic cheerleaders for Perfecto Prep.

Banjo Possum
Banjo Possum (voiced by Rob Paulsen), originally called "Woodpile Possum", is one of the minor characters on the show. He first appeared in the movie How I Spent My Vacation. He is a young, gray-and-white opossum with blue overalls, a brown-and-red hat, and a banjo. He lives in the swamps and backwoods with his kinfolk, who, unlike himself, tend to capture and prey on innocent travelers who wind up wandering into their territory. It is further confirmed in the "ACME Cable TV" episode that Banjo's family members are inbred and carnivorous, with one of his larger relatives proving the latter by devouring Montana Max alive and whole (though he escapes his stomach shortly after). He silently bonds with Buster over the way he can play his banjo in a similar way to how he (Buster) can play his own face, and through this friendship, he later rescues him, Babs, and Byron from a mob of predators (that includes some members of his own family, the alligator daughters who want to marry Buster, and their father) pursuing them late in the movie. Because of his friendship with them, he ultimately decides to enroll at Acme Looniversity at the end of the movie to get some "edumacation" and spend more time with them. Since his debut, he makes other appearances, both speaking and voiceless. Banjo is roughly based on the character Lonnie from the movie Deliverance.

Witch Sandy
Witch Sandy (voiced by Sally Struthers) is a witch based on Witch Hazel, and had a one-time appearance on the show in a parody of Hansel and Gretel. She lived in a house made out of carrot cake and drew the attention of Buster and Babs. She tried to use the two in a recipe like Hazel, turning Babs into a non-anthropomorphic white rabbit and summoning her cutlery to try and kill Buster, but she got turned into a goldfish. Sandy wears a cute disguise, but she is actually as hideous-looking as Hazel.

Saul Sheepdog
Saul Sheepdog is a blueish-gray sheepdog puppy based on Sam Sheepdog. He is a silent character, and makes cameo appearances in a few episodes such as "The Acme Bowl" and the short Duck Trek (a parody of Star Trek) from the episode "Cinemaniacs".

Chewcudda
Chewcudda (voiced by Frank Welker) is a bull and a minor character on the show. He only appeared in one episode, "A Quack in the Quarks", a parody of Star Wars Episode IV – A New Hope. Chewcudda was a parody of Chewbacca, except he is a bull and not a wookiee like Chewbacca. He is based on the Looney Tunes character Toro the bull from Bully for Bugs.

Chewcudda goes along for the ride with Plucky and Frank and Ollie (two young alien ducklings who came to Earth seeking a savior, but instead found Plucky), as they set off to try and take down Duck Vader (a parody of Darth Vader) and his versions of the stormtroopers (with armor shaped in the form of a duck). Plucky mistakes him for a bean bag at first and sits on him, but Chewcudda reveals himself and yells at Plucky. Plucky sticks out his tongue at the large bull, and this makes Chewcudda furious. He charges into him. Chewcudda charges into anything (or anyone) when he sees the color red, as Ollie states, "It's the bull in him."

Later, he is captured by the stormtroopers and his feet are tied up together by rope. He chews on grass (hence the pun "Chew" in his name) and spits it at a couple of the stormtroopers, knocking them over. When Frank throws a bottle of ketchup at Duck Vader, it busts and covers him in it, causing Chewcudda to break free from his rope and charge into Vader, sending him across the room and knocking him unconscious.

The Wackyland Rubber Band
The Wackyland Rubber Band is what the name implies, a band of anthropomorphic rubber bands that are residents of Wackyland. Capable of shaping themselves into various instruments from drums to horns, this lively quartet can play almost anything and is usually featured in large or important events, such as the halftime show of the football game in "The Acme Bowl" or the source of the music at the junior prom in "Prom-ise Her Anything".

They first appeared in the Looney Tunes series in Porky in Wackyland (1938) and its color remake Dough for the Do-Do (1949). They also appeared Tin Pan Alley Cats (1943).

Lightning Rodriguez
Lightning Rodriguez is a rejected mouse character based on Speedy Gonzales. According to creator Tom Ruegger, Rodriguez was conceived as a Latino character with speed as his main trait; however, it was feared that he would be seen as an ethnic stereotype as the Speedy Gonzales shorts had already become controversial for their portrayal of Mexico. Additionally, the staff felt that a younger Speedy was a low priority due to the addition of a fast character in Little Beeper.

Rodriguez had two background appearances in the show. In "The Acme Bowl", he is seen singing with the other 'Tiny Toons' around a campfire at night before playing against Perfecto Prep. In "You Asked For It", Plucky displays a machine that shows which character the fans want to see, and Rodriguez is one of the characters that pass by on the machine's screen.

Lady May
Lady May (voiced by Kath Soucie) is a pink female pig based on Petunia Pig. She only appeared at the beginning of "Buster and Babs Go Hawaiian", where Hamton stars in his own segment "Fleche de Lard" (meaning "arrow of lard"). When they are about to kiss, Buster and Babs interrupt the segment. Lady May ends up kissing Plucky.

In the segment itself, villainous Lord Sebastian (a wild boar) tells Lady May (the damsel in distress) that he plans to take her as his wife. Then "Sir Hamton the Prudent" comes to the rescue, challenging the villain to a sword duel. Hamton calls for Plucky as Knave Pluck to give him his sword. He battles Lord Sebastian, defeats him, and chases him away. Hamton thus saves Lady May. She and Hamton are about to kiss, only to be interrupted by Buster and Babs, who complain about not being in the cartoon. She is last seen in the background, kissing Plucky while Hamton tells them that this cartoon was his vehicle to stardom.

Egghead Jr.
Egghead Jr. is a one-shot character who greatly resembles Elmer Fudd (who himself had evolved from an earlier character named Egghead). In "Plucky's Dastardly Deed", he is "the smartest kid in class", whom Plucky aims to swap tests with. Egghead Jr. is based on the obscure Looney Tunes character Egghead. The former's head is a bit larger and his nose is smaller. The latter was never officially seen on Tiny Toon Adventures.

Egghead Jr. also appears in "Hog Wild Hamton", but this time is redrawn as the actual Egghead Jr., a genius baby chick from the Foghorn Leghorn series.

Julie Bruin
Julie Bruin (voiced by Julie Brown) is an attractive anthropomorphic female bear and a caricature/parody of her voice actress Julie Brown, who appears in the episode "Tiny Toon Music Television" in a segment called Just Say Julie Bruin, which is a parody of Brown's MTV Music Video show Just Say Julie.

She first appears after the opening credits of her sketch, where she is laying down what seems to be a version of Twister. She then tells the viewers that she's having a 1960s-style tango party with Buster and Babs, who said they invited Madonna to her party. When Buster and Babs arrive, they seem to be alone. Buster and Babs tell her that they did not say Madonna but Fuddonna (Elmer Fudd in disguise).

Julie puts on a music video starring Montana Max singing, "Money (That's What I Want)". She later makes a non-speaking appearance in the same music video on Monty's cruise ship, where he tosses her into the ocean. He throws a lifesaver for her to float on, but it hits her on the head instead.

Other antagonists

Gotcha Grabmore
Gotcha Grabmore (voiced by Joan Gerber) is an evil businesswoman who kills wild animals to make cosmetics. She only makes two appearances in "Raining Daze" where she tries to kill a seal. She later returned in "Whale's Tales" where she tries to kill some whales.

Gotcha first appears in the segment "Fur-Gone Conclusion" as the main antagonist. When Buster and Babs take a wrong turn on their way to Aruba and end up in Antarctica, Babs gets frozen in a block of ice and is defrosted by a baby seal. Gotcha captures the baby seal and attempts to skin it, so Babs and Buster disguise themselves as the Vanderbunnys in an attempt to save it.

Gotcha returns in the episode, "Whale's Tales", again as the main antagonist. She builds a new cosmetics factory and teams up with a crew of octopi pirates, led by Octavius. Together, they capture a mother whale, leaving her baby in the hands of Elmyra Duff. Buster and Babs rescue the baby whale and he takes them to Gotcha's factory. Gotcha plans to kill the mother whale to use her blubber for her cosmetics. She even threatens to kill the baby, to "make baby oil".

Gotcha makes a cameo appearance in the "A Cat's Eye View" episode segment "Party Crasher Plucky", where she is one of the celebrities seen attending Shirley MacLaine's party.

Dr. Gene Splicer
Dr. Gene Splicer is a mad scientist who does crazy things to animals. He appeared in episode 1, episode 14, Tiny Toons NES, Buster Busts Free, and Buster's Hidden Treasure.

Sappy Stanley
Sappy Stanley (voiced by Jonathan Winters) is a green elephant who is very jealous of Bugs Bunny. He has made only one appearance, in "Who Bopped Bugs Bunny?", which is a parody of Who Framed Roger Rabbit?. Sappy Stanley is a parody of Terrytoons character Sidney the Elephant a.k.a. Silly Sidney. Sidney was created by Gene Deitch.

As a baby, Stanley discovered he had the ability to make others laugh when chimpanzees threw coconuts at his head and laughed at him. Throughout the 1950s, Stanley starred in many classic cartoons. His best cartoon was "Which Way to the Arctic?", which involved him getting hit by coconut-throwing chimpanzees. The film was nominated for the Hollywood Shloscar (a parody of the Oscars), but lost to Knighty Knight Bugs (1958). Outraged, Stanley moved to Paris, where he became a national star, but slowly began building up his revenge against Bugs Bunny.

The historical background to the episode was the nomination of Silly Sidney's second short, called "Sidney's Family Tree" (1958), for an Academy Award for Best Animated Short Film. It lost to Knighty Knight Bugs.

The Wolverine
The Wolverine is an evil wolverine who tries to eat the Tiny Toons. He is first introduced in "Buster and the Wolverine" (a spoof of Peter and the Wolf), and makes cameos in various other cartoons. In his debut appearance, he manages to kidnap Hamton, Plucky, Babs, Sweetie, and Furrball, and he is successful in devouring them all. However, they are later rescued by Buster, and they all work together to defeat him. In the same episode, he also makes a brief attempt at devouring Montana Max, Shirley, and Gogo.

The Coyote Kid
The Coyote Kid (voiced by Frank Welker) is a brown coyote who is an outlaw and is the main antagonist of "High Toon". He bears a close resemblance to Wile E. Coyote, but is not to be confused with him.

Sources

References

1990s television-related lists
Child characters in animated television series
Child characters in television
Tiny Toon Adventures
Tiny Toon Adventures
Tiny Toon Adventures